Union Resolve 2022 were joint military exercises between the Armed Forces of the Russian Federation and the Republic of Belarus, which were held from February 10 to 20, 2022.

References

Prelude to the 2022 Russian invasion of Ukraine
2022 in Belarus
2022 in Russia
2022 in military history
Belarusian military exercises
Belarus–Russia relations
Military exercises involving Russia
February 2022 events in Europe
February 2022 events in Russia